Walter Aston, 8th Lord Aston of Forfar (10 October 1732 – 29 July 1805) was the son of Edward Aston and Anne Bayley.

In 1763, Walter succeeded his childless cousin Walter Aston, 7th Lord Aston of Forfar, as Lord Aston of Forfar in the peerage of Scotland.

Life
Before inheriting the barony, Aston worked as a watchmaker.

Scottish Peers were entitled to vote to elect 16 Representative Peers to the House of Lords. In 1768 Lord Aston's right to vote in these elections raised objections as he was not listed on the Union Roll as his right to the title Lord Aston of Forfar was not confirmed. I n 1769 King George III awarded Lord Aston an annual pension of £300. In this award, King George refers to Walter as "Walter, Lord Aston, Baron of Forfar".

The Gentleman's Magazine referred to him as "an inoffensive man of rather a convivial turn".

Lord Aston of Forfar died in London on 29 July 1805 at the age of 72. He was buried at the Grosvenor Chapel in London.

Family
Walter married Anne Hutchinson on 28 May 1766. Anne was the daughter of Peter Hutchinson. She died in 1808 and was buried at Bath Abbey. They had three children:
Elizabeth Jane, who died young
Walter, a Church of England Clergyman who succeeded his father as 9th Lord Aston of Forfar.
William Bailey, who was lost at sea, and elder son Walter Aston,

References

Courthope, William (editor). (1836.) "Debrett's Complete Peerage of The United Kingdom of Great Britain and Ireland, 21st edition". Printed for J. G. & F. Rivington and others by G. Woodfall: London, page 400. Retrieved 2007-10-11.

Notes

See also
Lord Aston of Forfar

Lords of Parliament
1732 births
1805 deaths